Cannula is a genus of African grasshoppers in the family Acrididae. There are at least three described species in Cannula.

Species
These three species belong to the genus Cannula:
 Cannula gracilis (Burmeister, H., 1838) c g
 Cannula karschi (Kirby, W.F., 1910) c g
 Cannula vestigialis Roy, R., 2003 c g
Data sources: i = ITIS, c = Catalogue of Life, g = GBIF, b = Bugguide.net

References

External links

 

Acrididae